Liocrobyla tephrosiae is a moth of the family Gracillariidae. It is known from South Africa.

The larvae feed on Tephrosia polystachya. They mine the leaves of their host plant. The mine has the form of a very irregular, semi-transparent blotch-mine without a gallery.

References

Endemic moths of South Africa
Gracillariinae
Moths of Africa